Elk Rock State Park is a state park of Iowa, USA, located in Marion County situated on both upstream banks of Red Rock Reservoir. Knoxville at the southwest and Pella to the northeast are the nearest cities. On north are Otley and Monroe; at the west is Pleasantville.

Elk Rock has two areas: the main area and the "Mile Long Bridge" area. The bridge area is much smaller than the main area but has a couple of shelters and a restroom facility.
The main area has many camp sites, two boat ramps, park office, and various trails.

History
Native American inhabitation dates back five thousand years. The Sac and Fox tribes granted white settlers rights to the grounds in 1842. The outlines of the extinct town of Red Rock lie at the bottom of the lake.

The United States Army Corps of Engineers began construction of a dam in 1960 and completed it in 1969. In 1969, the Iowa Conservation Commission leased land from the Corps of Engineers to establish North Elk Rock (now Cordova Park). In 1978, a lease was obtained for South Elk Rock which is now what is considered Elk Rock State Park.

Land usage
The Red Rock Reservoir provides for good fishing as well as general boating and swimming activities. Elk Rock also has an equestrian camping area with a 100′ x 200′ arena and other facilities.

Red Rock also serves as a stopping point for migratory birds and other waterfowl. 200 species of birds, 54 species of trees, 62 species of wildflowers, 43 species of fish, and 35 species of mammals have been seen here.

References

External links
 Elk Rock State Park

State parks of Iowa
Protected areas established in 1978
Protected areas of Marion County, Iowa
1978 establishments in Iowa